Haki Korça ( – February 2006) was a Turkish-born Albanian football player who played for both Sportklub Tiranë during the 1930s and early 1940s.

Korça tried his luck in Italian football during World War II along with compatriots Loro Boriçi and Sllave Llambi.

Personal life and death
Korça was born in Istanbul, Turkey, but raised in Tiranë, Albania. He later moved to Rome, Italy, before settling in Toronto, Ontario, Canada. He died there in February 2006, at the age of 89.

Honours
Albanian Superliga: 2
 1932, 1934

References 

1910s births
Year of birth uncertain
2006 deaths
Footballers from Tirana
Albanian footballers
Association football forwards
KF Tirana players
A.S. Roma players
Albanian expatriate footballers
Expatriate footballers in Italy
Albanian expatriate sportspeople in Italy